Jhurell Pressley (born May 20, 1992) is a former American football running back. He played college football at New Mexico and was signed by the Minnesota Vikings as an undrafted free agent in 2016. He has also been a member of the Green Bay Packers, Atlanta Falcons, Jacksonville Jaguars, New York Giants, Arizona Hotshots, and DC Defenders.

Early life
Jhurell was born on May 20, 1992 in Newark, Delaware to Valerie Pasley and Edward Pressley. He has two older sisters and three older brothers. Pressley has stated his favorite athlete is NBA All-Star Dwyane Wade. He played high school football at Red Lion Christian Academy.

College career
Pressley attended The University of New Mexico, where he played on the New Mexico Lobos football team from 2011 to 2015. While at New Mexico, he majored in sociology.

Statistics
Source: GoLobos.com

Professional career

Minnesota Vikings
After going undrafted in the 2016 NFL Draft, Pressley signed with the Minnesota Vikings on May 2, 2016. On September 3, 2016, he was waived by the Vikings during final team cuts.

Green Bay Packers
On September 5, 2016, Pressley was claimed off waivers by the Green Bay Packers. He was released by the Packers on September 14, 2016.

Atlanta Falcons
Pressley was signed to the Atlanta Falcons' practice squad on October 25, 2016. On August 16, 2017, Pressley re-signed with the Falcons. He was waived on September 2, 2017 and was signed to the Falcons' practice squad the next day. He was released on September 19, 2017.

Jacksonville Jaguars
On September 26, 2017, Pressley was signed to the Jacksonville Jaguars' practice squad. He was released on October 9, 2017.

New York Giants
On August 20, 2018, Pressley signed with the New York Giants. He was waived on September 1, 2018 and was signed to the practice squad the next day. He was released on November 8, 2018.

Arizona Hotshots
On February 10, 2019, Pressley made his debut for the Arizona Hotshots in their season opener against the Salt Lake Stallions. His 64 rushing yards and 30 yard touchdown reception in the opener earned him AAF Team of the Week honors. The league ceased operations in April 2019.

Pressley was suspended for the first two weeks of the 2019 NFL season for violating the NFL's performance-enhancing drugs policy on April 5, 2019. He was reinstated from suspension on September 17, 2019.

DC Defenders
Pressley was taken in the 3rd round in the 2020 XFL Draft by the DC Defenders. He had his contract terminated when the league suspended operations on April 10, 2020.

References

External links
 
 
 New Mexico Lobos bio
 

1992 births
Living people
Players of American football from Delaware
Sportspeople from the Delaware Valley
People from Newark, Delaware
American football running backs
New Mexico Lobos football players
Minnesota Vikings players
Green Bay Packers players
Atlanta Falcons players
Jacksonville Jaguars players
New York Giants players
Arizona Hotshots players
DC Defenders players